Peter McLaughlin (born August 8, 1949) was an American politician and educator.

McLaughlin was born in Corry, Pennsylvania. He received his bachelor's degree from Princeton University in 1971 and his master's degree from Humphrey School of Public Affairs in 1977. McLaughlin taught at Metropolitan State University and lived in Minneapolis, Minnesota. McLaughlin served on the Hennepin County Commission from 1991 to 2018 and was a Democrat. He also served on the Minnesota Council on Black Minnesotans. McLaughlin served in the Minnesota House of Representatives from 1985 to 1990.

References

1949 births
Living people
People from Corry, Pennsylvania
Politicians from Minneapolis
Educators from Minnesota
Princeton University alumni
Humphrey School of Public Affairs alumni
County commissioners in Minnesota
Democratic Party members of the Minnesota House of Representatives